The 2008 Men's EuroFloorball Cup Finals were held in Winterthur, Switzerland from 8 to 12 October 2008.

It was the 16th running of the tournament known earlier as the European Cup. In 2008 the tournament returned to an annual format rather than every two years.

Qualification Format
The reigning champion and the national champion teams of the top 4 nations at the 2007–08 EuroFloorball Cup automatically qualify. In 2008 the nations were Sweden, Finland, Switzerland, and the Czech Republic.

The remaining three teams are decided in regional neats. In Group C, the runners-up to the top team in Sweden, Finland, Switzerland, and the Czech Republic played for a spot in the finals. In the 2007–08 EuroFloorball Cup, both the top team in Sweden and the runners-up automatically qualified for the tournament, and therefore Group C consisted of 3 teams instead of 4. In Groups A and B, the teams are split into regions: West Europe and East Europe, respectively. The winning team in each group advances to the finals, making the total number of teams eight.

To be eligible to take part in the 2008 Men's EuroFloorball Cup, teams that take place in regional qualification must capture the national title in floorball in their country. If that team does not register, then the 2nd place team can register, and so forth.

Qualifying Venues
Group A qualifications for Western Europe took place in Frederikshavn, Denmark from 13 to 17 August 2008.
Group B qualifications for Eastern Europe took place in Bratislava, Slovakia from 27 to 31 August 2008.Group C qualifications took place in Helsinki, Finland from 22 to 24 August 2008.

Championship results

Preliminary round

Conference A

8 October 2008

9 October 2008

10 October 2008

Conference B

8 October 2008

9 October 2008

10 October 2008

Playoffs

Semi-finals

Bronze-medal match

Championship Match

Placement round

7th-place match

5th-place match

External links
Official Website
2008 Men's EuroFloorball Cup Finals Switzerland – Schedule & Statistics
2008 Men's EuroFloorball Cup Qualifying Denmark – Schedule & Statistics
2008 Men's EuroFloorball Cup Qualifying Slovakia – Schedule & Statistics
2008 Men's EuroFloorball Cup Qualifying Finland – Schedule & Statistics

EuroFloorball Cup
Mens Eurofloorball Cup Finals, 2008
Winterthur